Précis or precis may refer to:

an abridgement or summary
Critical précis, a type of written text
IRAC case brief, in law
Précis (album), a 2006 music album
Precis (butterfly), a genus of butterflies
Mitsubishi Precis, a make of car
Precis Neumann, a character in the PlayStation game Star Ocean: The Second Story
PRECIS (Providing Regional Climates for Impacts Studies), a regional climate model